Tactical Network Solutions is a Maryland-based information security company specializing in 802.11 and Wi-Fi Protected Setup (WPS).  Their WPS exploitation tool was released to the open source community after the vulnerability in WPS was publicly disclosed by Stefan Viehbock on December 27, 2011.

References

External links 
 tacnetsol.com

Computer security companies
Software companies established in 2007
2007 establishments in Maryland